Jasmine Baird (born 29 June 1999) is a Canadian snowboarder who competes internationally in the big air and slopestyle disciplines. Baird was born in Mississauga, but was raised in Georgetown, Ontario.

Career 
At the start of the 2021–22 FIS Snowboard World Cup, Baird won the bronze medal in the big air event at the stop in Chur, Switzerland.

On 19 January 2022, Baird was named to Canada's 2022 Olympic team in the Slopestyle and Big Air events.

Life
She was 18 months old when she started snowboarding at Beaver Valley Ski Club in Ontario.  At age 12, she started getting into slopestyle. She started competing competitively at age 15.
She was very inspired by many people but in particular other female snowboarders.

References

External links 
 

1999 births
Living people
Canadian female snowboarders
Sportspeople from Mississauga
Snowboarders at the 2022 Winter Olympics
Olympic snowboarders of Canada
21st-century Canadian women